The Youth Employment Service was a British government agency from the 1950s to the 1970s, aimed at school-leavers (teenagers).

History
From the late 1910s, many Local Education Authorities in England and Wales had set up Youth Employment Services, started by the Education (Choice of Employment) Act 1910, for up to the age of 17. Scotland had not been allowed to do this. The Education Act 1918 allowed LEAs to guidance up to the age of 18.

The Unemployment Insurance Act 1923 allowed LEAs to cover juveniles in an unemployment insurance scheme. In 1927 the Ministry of Labour established the National Advisory Council for Juvenile Employment.

The Employment and Training Act 1948 was passed by the Labour government of 1945-51, and section 10 of this act established and employment advisory service for all young people under 18 who attended school. By January 1949, 43 county councils and 73 county boroughs in England and Wales, and 3 town councils and 10 county councils in Scotland had submitted plans for their youth employment services.

In the 1950s and 1960s, the service had great popular support.

It would be replaced from the late 1970s onwards by the Careers Service.

Purpose
The organisation (also known as the Y.E.S.), set up in district and regional centres, provided vocational guidance for people aged around 16-17, many often from grammar schools. Only the most academic would attend university from the age of 18 in the 1950s, and many of those at grammar school would not stay until the age of 18. The A-level had been introduced in 1951, and previous to this it had been the Higher School Certificate; in Scotland it has been the Higher exam. In 1945 24% of those at grammar school left before the age of 16; by 1949 this had lowered to 16%. In 1945, 15% of those at grammar school would stay until the age of 18; by 1949, this was over 20%. By 1955, around 34% of those at grammar school stayed on until 18.

In 1962, around 38% of boys found apprenticeships.

Structure
It was financed by the Ministry of Labour and local authorities.

The total cost in the early 1950s of the service per year was around £1.7m. In a study from 1950-3, it was found that around 1.48m school-leavers had been given advice, and from that 1.357m had directly found employment.

A Training Allowance Scheme had been introduced in 1947 for Youths when Training away from Home. Those working in the service were known as Youth Employment Officers; in later years, their function was largely taken over by careers advisory officers. The service was run by the Central Youth Employment Executive, composed of people from the Ministry of Labour, the Ministry of Education and the Scottish Education Department. In 1963 there were around 1,000 youth employment officers. Youth Employment Officers were trained at the Youth Employment Service Training Board.

The service had eight activities
 Contact with school - the service could request school reports for all children of the minimum (statutory) school leaving age.
 Knowledge of opportunities available - from a working knowledge of local industries
 Contact with potential school-leavers - to introduce children to the realities of going to work, and giving work-experience schemes
 Training - to discuss what courses would be suitable for the appropriate career that had been chosen
 Placing
 Review of progress - if the youngster was later unhappy in the job they had chosen
 Disabled children
 Unemployment insurance and supplementary allowances

See also
 Career Development Institute, the former National Association of Youth Employment Officers, who worked at the service
 Central Advisory Council for Education
 National Youth Employment Council, set up by the act, and appointed by the Ministry of Labour three years at a time
 Youth Opportunities Programme, established by a Labour government in 1978
 Youth Training Scheme (YTS), established in 1983 by the Conservative government of Margaret Thatcher
 National Apprenticeship Service

References

 The Future Development of the Youth Employment Service, 1965

1948 establishments in the United Kingdom
Career advice services
Defunct departments of the Government of the United Kingdom
Employment in the United Kingdom
Youth employment